Alexander Nikolayevich Shokhin (born December 25, 1951) is a Russian state, political and public figure and a Member of the Bureau of the Supreme Council of the party United Russia. Minister of Labour of the RSFSR  (August 26, 1991   — November 10, 1991). On 20 January 1994  to 6 November 1994  - Minister of the Russian economy. 23 March   1994  to 6 November 1994  —  Deputy Chairman of the Russian Government.

In September 1998 he was appointed Deputy Premier of the Russian Government in the Cabinet of Yevgeny Primakov, but even before the official addition of deputy powers in October 1998, has resigned from this position. Since 2014 he is santcioned by Euopean Union.

References

External links
 Официальный сайт

1951 births
Living people
Russian economists
People from Plesetsky District
Deputy heads of government of the Russian Federation
Recipients of the Order "For Merit to the Fatherland", 3rd class
Recipients of the Order of Honour (Russia)
Economy ministers of Russia
Members of the Civic Chamber of the Russian Federation
Our Home – Russia politicians
20th-century Russian politicians
Communist Party of the Soviet Union members
United Russia politicians
21st-century Russian politicians
First convocation members of the State Duma (Russian Federation)
Second convocation members of the State Duma (Russian Federation)
Third convocation members of the State Duma (Russian Federation)
Academic staff of the Higher School of Economics
Russian individuals subject to European Union sanctions